Russell John "Rusty" Lisch (born December 21, 1956) is an American former football quarterback in the National Football League. He played five seasons for the St. Louis Cardinals (1980–1983) and the Chicago Bears (1984). In five seasons in the NFL, Lisch only managed one touchdown versus 11 interceptions, and ended his career with a 25.1 passer rating. He is considered by many to be one of the least effective quarterbacks in NFL history, if not the least effective, to have started multiple games.

Career 
At the University of Notre Dame, Lisch was part of Dan Devine's first recruiting class in 1975. He made his first start in place of injured Rick Slager in 1976, achieving a 40–27 victory against Miami. He started the first three games of 1977, but then yielded the starting job to Joe Montana. Lisch would finally be named the permanent starting quarterback as a fifth-year senior in 1979, winning seven of ten starts, highlighted by his 336-yard passing effort as the Irish rallied from a 17–3 deficit against South Carolina for an 18–17 victory.

Lisch began his professional football career as the third-string quarterback with the St. Louis Cardinals. He completed six of 17 passes for 68 yards in the second half of a season-ending 31–7 loss to the Washington Redskins at Busch Memorial Stadium on December 21, 1980. With the Cardinals out of playoff contention again, and injuries to Ken Greene and Roy Green, Lisch was pressed into service as a free safety in the last three games of the 1981 campaign; despite having previously never played the position, he agreed with head coach Jim Hanifan and Cardinals coaching staff that this situation was better than being inactive on the sidelines.

Lisch's rather poor NFL career caused him to receive the "honor" as the worst player in NFL history from sports blog Deadspin in 2011, with the blog saying:

One year later, with both Jim McMahon and Steve Fuller injured, Lisch started a game for the Bears against Green Bay, but played so poorly that coach Mike Ditka berated Lisch before benching him late in the first half; Ditka inserted running back Walter Payton at quarterback. 

A 2020 ESPN article detailing the Bears' perennially subpar quarterback play at the time revealed Lisch had declined to return to the field after being berated for his poor play. On the subsequent flight home, Lisch, a religious man, was reading the Bible when Ditka walked up and told him, "I hope there is something in that book about job opportunities, because you'll need one on Monday." That Monday, Lisch brought Ditka a rosary prior to being released. It would be Lisch's final season in the NFL.

Personal life 
His son is former professional basketball player Kevin Lisch.

References

1956 births
Living people
American football quarterbacks
St. Louis Cardinals (football) players
Chicago Bears players
Notre Dame Fighting Irish football players
Sportspeople from Belleville, Illinois
Players of American football from Illinois